Napak is a town in Northern Uganda. It is the commercial, administrative and municipal headquarters of Napak District. The district is named after the town.

Location
The approximate coordinates of Napak are: 2°06'56.0"N 34°13'36.0"E (Latitude:2.115556; Longitude:34.226670).

Population
During the national census and household survey of 27 and 28 August 2014, the Uganda Bureau of Statistics (UBOS), enumerated the population of Napak Town Council at 5,278 people.

Points of interest
The following points of interest lie within the town limits or close to the edges of town: (a) The offices of Napak Town Council (b) The headquarters of Napak District Administration (c) Napak Central Market and (d) the Soroti–Katakwi–Moroto–Lokitanyala Road which passes through Napak Town in a general south to north direction.

See also
 Napak District
 Karamoja sub-region
 Northern Region, Uganda

References

External links
  Napak Struggles With Rubbish And Animals
  Karamoja: From A Neglected Desert To A Region On The Move

Populated places in Northern Region, Uganda
Napak District
Karamoja